"John the Revelator" is a gospel blues call and response song.  Music critic Thomas Ward describes it as "one of the most powerful songs in all of pre-war acoustic music ... [which] has been hugely influential to blues performers".  American gospel-blues musician Blind Willie Johnson recorded "John the Revelator" in 1930. Subsequently, a variety of artists, including the Golden Gate Quartet, Son House, Depeche Mode, Jerry Garcia Band, The Forest Rangers, have recorded their renditions of the song, often with variations in the verses and music.

The song's title refers to John of Patmos in his role as the author of the Book of Revelation.  A portion of that book focuses on the opening of seven seals and the resulting apocalyptic events.  In its various versions, the song quotes several passages from the Bible in the tradition of American spirituals.

Blind Willie Johnson version
Blind Willie Johnson recorded "John the Revelator" during his fifth and final recording session for Columbia Records in Atlanta, Georgia on April 20, 1930.  Accompanying Johnson on vocal and guitar is Willie B. Harris (sometimes identified as his first wife), who sings the response parts of the song.  Their vocals add a "sense of dread and foreboding" to the song, along with the chorus line "Who's that a writin', John the Revelator" "repeated like a mantra".

Johnson's lyrics reference a number of passages from the Bible:

The song was released as one of the last singles by Johnson and is included on numerous compilations, including the 1952 Anthology of American Folk Music.

Golden Gate Quartet version 
In 1938, the Golden Gate Quartet recorded an a capella version. It was inducted into the United States National Recording Registry in 2005, which recognizes recordings that are "culturally, aesthetically, or historically significant". The song is included on several compilation albums, such as Our Story (2001, Columbia Records).

Son House rendition
Delta blues musician Son House recorded several a cappella versions of "John the Revelator" in the 1960s.  His lyrics for a 1965 recording explicitly reference three theologically important events: the Fall of Man, the Passion of Christ, and the Resurrection.

This version was included on the 1965 album The Legendary Son House: Father of the Folk Blues (Columbia).  An alternate version from the same session is found on the 1992 reissue Son House — Father of the Delta Blues: The Complete 1965 Sessions (Columbia).

References and notes

1930 songs
Songwriter unknown
Blind Willie Johnson songs
Gospel songs
Blues songs
Cultural depictions of religious leaders
United States National Recording Registry recordings
Songs based on the Bible